"Liberation" is a 1995 song by British recording artist Lippy Lou, released as her debut single. Produced by German DJ and producer Mike Koglin, it was described by Billboard as a "coming out anthem" and was released on Boy George's record label More Protein. It peaked at number 57 on the UK Singles Chart, but was a even bigger hit on the UK Dance Chart, reaching number 8. Outside Europe, it peaked at number 102 in Australia. A music video was made to accompany the song, directed by director Ben Unwin. It has a blue sepia tone. In 1996, the song was again released as "Liberation (The CD Comeback Mixes)", with new remixes.

In a 1994 interview, Lippy Lou told about making the song, "I first thought of making this record to save on all the stamps I'd have to buy to tell everyone back home about my sexual preferences. I had a moment of worry, but it disappeared pretty quickly. I'm proud of this record. It makes an important statement about freedom and acceptance."

Critical reception
In 1994, Larry Flick from Billboard described the track as "an aggressive club storm that blends rave-drenched keyboards with blunt ragga chatting extolling the joys of lesbian life-both in and out of the bedroom." In 1995, he added that Lippy Lou "raps and toasts on the virtues of homosexual freedom" in "a flurry of slick Euro-dance grooves". He stated that the track "has ferocious energy and passion that grabs the mind and body at the same time," and that the radio version "will not offend or scare listeners, while the original version has red-hot lyrics that are both brave and amusing." Brad Beatnik from Music Week'''s RM'' Dance Update wrote, "The young ragga-chatting lesbian pulls no punches on this debut track which matches the bite of its uncompromising pro-lesbian lyrics with hard tribal beats, wild riffing guitar and a Euro-house melody. The concoction is simplt irresistible – Lippy has a great voice. Mike Koglin's production is excellent and the song's message will certainly grab attention. Suck it and see."

Track listing

Charts

References

External links
 Lippy Lou on Discogs

1995 songs
1995 debut singles
House music songs
LGBT-related songs
Music videos directed by Ben Unwin
Songs written by John Themis